The Bøyg, also referred to as the "Great Bøyg of Etnedal"  is a legendary gnome-like creature in  Scandinavian folklore. 

It is a great troll from Telemark and Gudbrandsdalen. It is commonly characterized as a giant, slimy serpent which stands as a hindrance to travellers. The name means 'bend', 'twist' or 'curve'. It appears  in  the fairy tale of Per Gynt, the basis for Henrik Ibsen's play Peer Gynt.

References

Fairy tale stock characters
Scandinavian legendary creatures
Legendary serpents
Scandinavian folklore